Bar Aftab-e Sarfaryab (also Romanized as Bar Āftāb-e Sarfāryāb; also known as Bar Āftāb) is a village in Sarfaryab Rural District, Sarfaryab District, Charam County, Kohgiluyeh and Boyer-Ahmad Province, Iran. At the 2006 census, its population was 1,968, in 453 families.

References 

Populated places in Charam County